Forest of Equilibrium is the debut album of the British doom metal band Cathedral, released in 1991 on Earache Records. It is considered a classic of its genre, doom metal. Forest of Equilibrium was notably inducted into Decibel magazine's Hall of Fame in February 2006 being the 12th inductee for the Decibel Hall of Fame.

In 2009, Earache Records reissued the album along with four "bonus" songs that comprise the long out-of-print 1992 Soul Sacrifice EP. This deluxe digipak reissue also  includes a poster of Dave Patchett's cover art and a new 40-minute documentary entitled "Return to the Forest" on DVD.

Track listing
all lyrics by Lee Dorrian unless noted; All music by Garry Jennings unless noted.

Personnel

Cathedral
 Lee Dorrian – vocals, production assistant
 Garry Jennings – guitar, production assistant
 Adam Lehan – guitar, acoustic guitar
 Mark Griffiths – bass guitar
 Mike Smail – drums

Additional musicians
 Reverend Wolski – keyboard
 Helen Acreman – flute

Technical personnel
 PBL – production
 Mark Tempest – engineering
 Dave Patchett – sleeve artwork
 Jason Tilley – photos
 J. Barry – layout

References

Bibliography
 "Doom Top Tens: The Depths Of Doom" (2006). Terrorizer, 144, 52–53.

1991 debut albums
Cathedral (band) albums
Earache Records albums